Kijoba is a village and municipality in the Astara Rayon of Azerbaijan.  It has a population of 4,412.  Kijoba's tea plantations are a local focus of ecotourism.

References 

Populated places in Astara District